This is a list of characters from the Cartoon Network animated series, Courage the Cowardly Dog.

Main

Courage

Voiced by Howard Hoffman (pilot) and Marty Grabstein (series; Straight Outta Nowhere: Scooby-Doo! Meets Courage the Cowardly Dog)

Courage is the title character and protagonist of the series. An overly frightened pink beagle who lives in Nowhere, Kansas.
Courage was abandoned as a puppy after his parents were sent into outer space, but was adopted by Muriel Bagge. Her husband Eustace regularly mistreats him. Ironically, given his name, Courage is a genuine coward and he often expresses his distress with over-the-top, piercing shrieks. Regardless, he still goes to great lengths to protect his owners. To the end, he often gets injured, sometimes quite brutally, and only surviving through his determination and/or pure luck. Despite his cowardice, Courage is very clever and resourceful when the situation demands it, outsmarting the villains most of the time. He also often displays super strength, carrying Muriel and Eustace with relative ease. Aiding him at saving the day is a self-aware, sarcastic and seemingly omniscient computer that he keeps in the attic. He got his name when Muriel found him as a puppy alone in an alley and remarked that he must be quite brave to be there by himself.

Muriel Bagge

Voiced by Howard Hoffman (pilot) and Thea White (series; Straight Outta Nowhere: Scooby-Doo! Meets Courage the Cowardly Dog).

Muriel Bagge is Courage's owner and Eustace's wife. She is an elderly, overweight, kind, hard-working Scottish woman who took Courage in when he was an abandoned puppy. Muriel often carries a rolling pin that she hits Eustace with whenever he harasses Courage. She also likes tea and usually tends to her garden, as well as being an accomplished sitar player. Muriel also has a great fondness for cooking; however, her recipes tend to include an excessive amount of vinegar, much to the distaste of both her dog and husband. Most of all, she loves sitting in her rocking chair with Courage on her lap and watching television. Due to her kindness and sweet nature, Muriel is an easy (and often attractive) target for villains. The crossover movie Straight Outta Nowhere: Scooby-Doo! Meets Courage the Cowardly Dog was White’s final role before she died of liver cancer in 2021.

Eustace BaggeVoiced by Howard Hoffman (pilot), Lionel Wilson (Episodes 1–33), Arthur Anderson (Episodes 34–52), Wallace Shawn ("The Fog of Courage"), and Jeff Bergman (Straight Outta Nowhere: Scooby-Doo! Meets Courage the Cowardly Dog)Eustace Bagge is Muriel's husband. He is an elderly, skinny, smart, and cynical American man who is obsessed with his vintage truck. Eustace wears glasses identical in appearance to Muriel's. His brown hat shields his glistening bald head.
Eustace is the current owner of the farmhouse, which was previously owned by his now-deceased brother Horst. Eustace regularly yells at Courage and calls him a "Stupid dog!" He regularly demeans Muriel as well, but he still does love his wife, as evidenced by his concern for her well-being in a few episodes, like "Demon in the Matteress". 

Lionel Wilson originally voiced the character, but left midway through the third season due to illness (and eventually died five months after the show ended) and was replaced by Arthur Anderson. However, some vocals and sounds of grunting, laughing, screaming and catchphrases from Wilson have been used while Anderson was recording. In the 2014 short titled The Fog of Courage, Wallace Shawn replaced Anderson as the voice of Eustace. In the crossover special with Scooby-Doo, Straight Outta Nowhere: Scooby-Doo! Meets Courage the Cowardly Dog, veteran voice actor Jeff Bergman plays Eustace.

Supporting

Courage's ComputerVoiced by Simon Prebble (series), Paul Schoeffler ("The Fog of Courage") and Jeff Bergman (Straight Outta Nowhere: Scooby-Doo! Meets Courage the Cowardly Dog)Courage's computer that speaks with an English accent and gives him advice on how to deal with crazy situations. He is very cynical and sarcastic towards Courage and has a habit of regularly cracking jokes in any situation.

Dr. VindalooVoiced by Paul SchoefflerDr. Vindaloo is an Indian doctor with a thick accent, whom Eustace and Muriel see when something is wrong. He is one of the few characters in the series who can perfectly understand what Courage is trying to say. He diagnoses his patients as not having serious problems or that there is nothing that he can do, but has, on occasion, been a great help, as in "Invisible Muriel", where he managed to discover how to return Muriel to normal.

Ma BaggeVoiced by Billie Lou WattMa Bagge is the mother of Eustace and Horst and Muriel's mother-in-law, who shares a love-hate relationship with the farmer. She also lives in a trailer. She is also the widow of Icket Bagge. Like Eustace she is actually bald but wears a wig and looks almost identical to her son, but much shorter. Like Eustace, Ma is insecure due to being bald, but she does have her teeth. It is learned that Ma and Horst's ill treatment was part of Eustace's negative personality.

Shirley the MediumVoiced by Mary TestaShirley the Medium is a small green Chihuahua garbed as a stereotypical Gypsy fortune-teller who resides in a dilapidated caravan. She has a strong dislike of Eustace (whom she always refers to as "the stupid one") because he is greedy and selfish and she places Eustace under curses a lot to get him to be a better person. Shirley is one of Courage's three confidants, the others being the Computer and Dr. Vindaloo, and helps him occasionally by casting and reciting spells and playing the saxophone in-between verses.

Major antagonists

KatzVoiced by Paul SchoefflerKatz is a red, lanky anthropomorphic cat with a posh English accent. He is Courage's nemesis and the show's most recurring antagonist, though Muriel and Eustace consistently fail to recognize him. He specializes in scam businesses and is extremely sadistic. Many of his businesses involve torturing or outright killing his customers; for example, in "Night at the Katz Motel," he fed his motel residents to flesh-eating spiders, and in "Klub Katz," he transformed the vacationers into anthropomorphic machines to fight for him gladiator-style. All of his businesses enforce a strict "No Dogs Allowed" policy, forcing Courage to sneak in. He often challenges Courage to ironically banal games such as wall-ball and staring contests, which Courage invariably loses; nevertheless, he is always defeated in the end. Unlike the rest of the series villians, he is frequently accompanied by his own theme, which consists of a sinister hip-hop beat.

Le QuackVoiced by Paul SchoefflerLe Quack is a French con-artist duck, who first appears early in the show's first season, in which he has a fake amnesia-specialist license; he comes to the Bagges' house when Muriel suffers from amnesia. Since then, he frequently returns and manages to dupe Courage's owners into helping him commit crime sprees. Le Quack is also shown to be capable of escaping custody such as when he was first arrested and secondly cause a fire at prison.

Di LungVoiced by Tim Chi LyDi Lung is a young Chinese American inventor. He also likes to verbally and physically abuse Courage whenever he sees him, and often does his experiments on him. He made his debut appearance in the episode "Hothead". He is very inconsiderate and rude and usually gets caught in the middle of the chaos happening in Nowhere, prompting him to shout his catchphrase of "Watch where you're going, ya foo!", which is a running gag in the series. He is the inventor of Mecha Courage. Di Lung also has two aunts: one good and one bad, who are both the Empresses of China; thus, this could make him royalty.

Minor antagonists

Benton Tarantella and Errol Von VolkheimVoiced by Peter Fernandez (Benton) and Paul Schoeffler (Errol)Benton Tarantella (a pun of Quentin Tarantino) and Errol Von Volkheim (a pun of Erich Von Stroheim and Errol Flynn) are a zombified duo of murderers/snuff film directors. They would pose as ordinary movie producers to lure unsuspecting victims to their fates, killing them in the process. Tarantella returns in the episode, "Angry Nasty People", when he uses the camera to capture Eustace's nastiness towards Courage and Muriel and creates another version of Eustace named "Mr. Nasty." Courage pushed Tarantella into the quicksand he dug up in the living room and claims it is real nasty, ironically what he wanted for his show.

The Chicken from Outer SpaceVoiced by Howard HoffmanThe Chicken from Outer Space is the show's first villain, introduced by the pilot episode of the same name. His eggs are unlike regular chicken eggs as they have red spots with a red yolk, are mutagenic and whoever eats them will turn into one. In his first appearance, he tries to take over the farm, he lays eggs in the chicken coop which were eaten by Eustace and ends up being shot by his own laser gun, turning into a headless roast chicken. He later returns in "The Revenge of The Chicken from Outer Space" where he wants to use a plunger to rip off Courage's head and put it on his roasted body. He ends up ripping off Eustace's head and tries to destroy Courage but is then blown up in his space ship when a rocket blasts into it. In "Son of the Chicken from Outer Space", his three-headed son is sent to Earth to avenge him and kill Courage. Unfortunately, like their father, they are no match for the timid dog and fear that they will never be able to go home until Courage is dead. Feeling sympathy for them, Courage helps them by taking fake pictures to make it look like they succeeded in killing him and fool their mother into thinking that their mission was a success.

The SnowmanVoiced by Paul SchoefflerThe Snowman is a talking snowman believed to be the last of his kind due to global warming. In his first appearance, he tries to steal Eustace and Muriel's "anti-melting" gene. He manages to get Eustace's but Courage causes him to drop it. Courage manages to save Muriel from having hers removed. He is defeated when Courage causes him to fall into a frozen lake, making him the first "frozen snowman". However, he returns in "The Snowman's Revenge" where he turns the farmhouse into the West Pole and freezes Eustace and Muriel and tells Courage how he lost his home and friends. In the end, Courage fixes the North Pole and brings back the Snowman's friends and Ivana, his girlfriend, and is reunited with them. He has a voice pattern like that of Sean Connery.

The Cajun FoxVoiced by Paul SchoefflerThe Cajun Fox is a fox obsessed with cooking. He kidnaps Muriel in order to make a stew, using her as the final ingredient, but he ends up falling into the pot of stew himself when Courage falls on top of him and Muriel just as he is about to throw Muriel into the pot, making a "Cajun fox stew" instead.

Freaky FredVoiced by Paul SchoefflerFreaky Fred is Eustace and Muriel's creepy nephew who was sent to the "home for freaky barbers", due to his obsession with cutting the hair of people or animals to the point that they are bald. While visiting Muriel, he gets locked in the bathroom with Courage because of Eustace, and continuously shaves off all of Courage's fur, (except for the tail and a part where he left "With love- Fred") pausing to reminisce about similar incidents involving his pet gerbil, his ex-girlfriend Barbara and a customer at his barber shop.

The Clutching FootVoiced by Paul SchoefflerThe Clutching Foot is a strange foot fungus that Eustace had gotten and mutated into a self-aware being. It resembles a giant purple left foot with heads for toes and acts as if it were a stereotypical criminal mob, with the big toe as the kingpin, and the smaller toes as his goons.

Dr. GerbilVoiced by series creator John R. DilworthDr. Gerbil is a gerbil who speaks with a Southern accent, who has gone mad due to being experimented on and feeling trapped by his previous owners. He is now a mad scientist, who performs strange experiments on humans with homemade cosmetic products, because he believes that he needs to exact revenge on humans for what they do to animals.

Dr. ŽalostVoiced by Paul SchoefflerDr. Žalost is "the greatest unhappy scientist who ever lived" who lives in a giant, moving tower. He lives with his assistant, Rat, whom he constantly asks for a hug. He demands 33⅓ billion dollars from the city of Nowhere to fund his "Unhappy Cannonball" project, only to be brushed off by the city's officials as a scam artist. In retaliation, Žalost attacks the city by firing unhappy cannonballs from his mobile tower, making the citizens of the city depressed and unproductive. Despite receiving his money in the end, he refuses to return the inhabitants of the city to normal, as he is jealous of the happiness of others. He then turns his attention towards the Bagge family, determined to inflict sadness and depression on all of the inhabitants of Nowhere. His name Žalost is a word of Croatian, Serbian, Bosnian, or Slovenian origin meaning "sorrow" or "sadness".

The Goose GodVoiced by Paul SchoefflerThe Goose God is an anthropomorphic goose who came down from the heavens to search for the woman of his dreams, and ended up falling in love with Muriel, whom he competed with Courage for Eustace to make his wife and queen (even though Eustace is completely unaware this is happening). He later falls for Eustace's truck after hearing it honk. He has made cameos in various other episodes (usually lying on top of the truck).

Jeeves "Evil" WeevilVoiced by Paul SchoefflerJeeves "Evil" Weevil is a giant, polite, blood-sucking weevil who wears a blue tuxedo and hat. When the Bagges accidentally run him over with their truck and injure him, he is accepted into their home. While a seeming gentleman, he begins to suck the life out of the ever-oblivious Muriel and Eustace. He does not suck out dogs' lives, so Courage is unharmed. He succeeds at sucking out Eustace's life.

The King of FlanVoiced by Jorge PupoThe King of Flan is a man with a Spanish accent and the proprietor of a company that makes flan. He produces a TV commercial that uses hypnotism to attract customers, all of whom become morbidly obese after eating too much flan. Courage comes to stop The King of Flan from broadcasting on all the networks, and causes The King to accidentally hypnotize himself. The company is located at 1 Flan Drive in Flansville, Kansas.

King RamsesVoiced by series creator John R. DilworthKing Ramses is the ghost of a pharaoh from ancient Egypt. Two cat grave robbers steal a slab (decorated with images of King Ramses and pictures corresponding to each of his three curses) from his tomb and flee to Nowhere, but Ramses appears and demands the return of his slab. They refuse, so Ramses summons a swarm of locusts. He later attacks the farm when Courage finds the slab and Eustace refuses to return it after discovering it is worth a fortune, summoning a flood water, record player, and locusts. Eustace finally gives in and Courage throws the slab out of the house. After Eustace reclaims it, Ramses unleashes one final curse that imprisons Eustace in the slab as it is returned to Ramses's crypt the next day.

Mayan Baker
Mayan Baker, who appeared in the episode "Courage Meets the Mummy", is the reanimated corpse of a Mayan royal baker. In ancient times, the baker served cookies to the Mayan princess until she falsely accused him of stealing cookies and selling them to villagers for money, but the thief was really her trusted royal poobah. Thousands of years later, Professor Frith accidentally resurrected the Mummy. After attacking him, the Mummy decided to take revenge against Eustace and Muriel. He mistakes them for the princess and poobah. With some setbacks, the Mummy finally arrives at the farm where Courage hypnotized Eustace and Muriel into thinking they were the Mayan Princess and the Poobah. After recreating the situation from thousands of years earlier, Courage surmised that the Baker was framed by the Poobah. Satisfied, the Mummy decides to return to his tomb to eternally rest in peace when Muriel gives him Eustace's polka-dotted blanket for his entombment.

Mad DogVoiced by Peter FernandezMad Dog is a Doberman and the fierce leader of an evil dog-gang who began dating Bunny until Courage came to her aid.

Mecha Courage
Mecha Courage is a robotic version of Courage that was created by Di Lung in an attempt to prove that he has created a dog that is superior to Courage in every way. Mecha Courage resembles a mini-dome, colored pink with a purple underside and tail, on wheels, with a red, blinking light for a nose.

Mr. Nasty
Voiced by Arthur Anderson
Mr. Nasty is a being created by Benton Tarantella from Eustace's true evil essence. He is similar to Eustace (both in identity and personality), only with sunglasses in place of his eyeglasses, blue skin, and a deeper voice. After Mr. Nasty is brought into existence, he co-stars in Tarantella's reality TV show Angry Nasty People alongside Eustace, in which they both mistreat Courage and Muriel.

Mustafa al BacteriusVoiced by Arnold StangMustafa al Bacterius is an alien worm who appears in "Mission to the Sun". When Courage and the Bagges are sent on a mission to prevent the Sun from burning out, Bacterius attempts to sabotage their mission by firstly infecting and controlling Muriel's mind, and then using her to destroy their spaceship. Eventually, he is sucked out of the ship through the toilet and infects Eustace at the end of the episode.

The Queen of the Black PuddleVoiced by Ruth WilliamsonThe Queen of the Black Puddle is an otherworldly siren temptress who resides within a supernatural black puddle. Her sinister goals are to seduce men gradually until she eventually manages to guide them to her puddle, where she eats them. She appeared in an episode where she successfully managed to charm Eustace and almost succeeded in devouring him, but Courage triumphed over her after a battle with her. At the episode's end, when Courage is bathing, a canine version of the Queen of the Black Puddle appears from the bath water, leaving Courage confused and puzzled. She later returns as part of the group to get rid of Courage.

King Kong
King Kong is an ape that appears in "1,000 Years of Courage". When Courage and his owners are sent to a future Earth inhabited by talking banana people, the Big Ape poses as the Banana God in order to devour the banana people, while his nephew disguises himself as a benevolent sovereign. Courage exposes the monkey and ape's scheme, inciting the wrath of the banana people, who swiftly exact their revenge. With the ape and monkey defeated by Courage and his owners, the banana people crowned the three as their new rulers. Right after that, Courage, Eustace, and Muriel are sent back to the past.

Cruel VeterinarianVoiced by Jim CummingsThe Cruel Veterinarian is the overarching antagonist of Courage the Cowardly Dog, serving as the main antagonist of the episode "Remembrance of Courage Past", and the only veterinarian who was responsible for separating Courage from his parents as a puppy. He manipulated Courage's parents into talking with them alone, which was revealed to be a trick as he captured them. Courage followed the evil veterinarian to his secret lab as it was revealed that he was shoving and locking them in a rocket ship. This was as part of his secret breeding experiment, to see that normal dogs (in space) would breed space dogs. However, Courage attempted to save his parents, but is spotted by the vet, who chases him in the lab, finally going down a garbage chute to avoid being captured by the vet. He watches as his parents were sent to space, saddened that he couldn't save them. He was later adopted by Muriel. Years later, Muriel and Eustace took Courage (still traumatized by the events) to the same vet that kidnapped and launched his parents, after recognizing him from the past, talking to them about speaking to him alone, which was secretly just a facade as he tries to do the same actions that he did to his parents earlier to Courage. Courage is then caught by the evil vet, who then starts the countdown and then traps Courage in the rocket. When Muriel and Eustace discover his true nature, as well as attempt to rescue Courage, he decides that Muriel and Eustace "have seen too much", and that he cannot allow his operation and research to be discovered and exposed to the public.. He catches Muriel and Eustace with a net, and briefly explains that "they will become the first humans to see [his] secret experiment at work", and claiming that "breeding dogs in space is the future" of normal dog breeding (with Courage opposing the crazed vet's evil space breeding scheme), before trapping them in the rocket to be sent into space to prevent them from interfering with his cruel plan. However, Courage saves his owners from the imminent launch and foils the evil vet's plans, trapping him in the rocket instead. As the countdown to the launch ends, the rocket engines ignite and the rocket itself lifts off with the vet inside, finally ending his cruelty to dogs for good. At the end of the episode, his rocket already crash landed on an unnamed planet, as he opens the door and is then petrified, finding out that all the dogs (including Courage's parents, and the same dogs seen on the milk carton's "Missing" advertisement at the beginning of the episode) have survived, which meant that his breeding experiment to see that normal dogs would breed space dogs has failed. Out of pure anger and vengeance by the dogs, the Cruel Veterinarian laughs nervously onscreen for the last time before he is dragged off in a net and brutally mauled by the vengeful dogs off-screen for his actions, presumably to death. He is heard screaming in pain during the attack.

The EmpressVoiced by Winnie ChaffeeThe Empress is the aunt of Di Lung, and she appeared in "Squatting Tiger, Hidden Dog", where her source of power (a magic silkworm) is dying and needs the bones of someone truly innocent to recharge it. She tries to steal Muriel's bones, but is stopped by Courage and the Empress' twin sister (who is good and is the true Empress). The Bad Empress made a cameo appearance in "Aqua Farmer".

The Great FusilliVoiced by Jim CummingsThe Great Fusilli is an Italian alligator devoted to theater arts who turns people into puppets so that they cannot leave his show. He is defeated when he mistakes Courage for a ghost and falls off the balcony and becomes a marionette himself, but not before changing Eustace and Muriel.

The Weremole

The Weremole is a legendary mole similar to a werewolf but much smaller, yet just as fierce. It has a taste for rabbits and people and if a person is bitten by the weremole, they become one themselves. Its bite does not affect other creatures. The only way to reverse the transformation is to feed one of the weremole's hairs to the victim. The weremole bites Muriel on the hand and when the moon is full she transforms into a weremole. Courage and Eustace team up realizing that they are in more trouble than they thought. Courage and Eustace defeat Muriel when Courage drops one of the original weremole's hairs in Muriel's mouth, and Muriel returns to normal.

BushwickVoiced by Andre SogliuzzoBushwick (though he prefers just "Shwick") is a giant, shady cockroach who comes from a New York City neighborhood of the same name. He appears in the episode "Courage in the Big Stinkin' City" and invites Muriel, along with Courage and Eustace, backstage at Radio City Music Hall that is close to Rockefeller Center in Midtown Manhattan in New York City, New York so that Muriel can rehearse for a sitar concert which was a prize that she won in a contest. Bushwick sends Courage away to retrieve an evil package, threatening to sentence Muriel to be a victim of an unseen monster behind a locked door if he does not receive the package before curtain time. He gets arrested by the New York City Police Department police officer in the end, however, Courage and Muriel gets her concert.

The Windmill Vandals
The Windmill Vandals are a group of 4 horsebacked Vandals (Eastern Germanic Tribesmen) who once plagued the land of Nowhere. The farmer who once lived in the farmhouse where the Bagge family now reside constructed the windmill next to the farmhouse, and inscribed several runes, one on each blade of the windmill, in order to keep the Vandals away. In the episode in which they appear, the windmill breaks, and the Vandals appear as wraiths to come and destroy the farmhouse (even though there were other instances where the windmill was damaged throughout the show and the Vandals did not appear). The mill is repaired and broken several times, until finally it is fully fixed, and the Vandals banished forever more.

Robot RandyVoiced by Peter FernandezRobot Randy is an outcast from a distant planet populated by gigantic violent robots. He is sent to conquer Earth to redeem his honor. Once on the planet, he enslaves Eustace, Muriel, and Courage, forcing them to build statues of him. However, he is internally conflicted, as he does not wish to hurt others, but instead to whittle reindeer. Courage challenges Randy in a competition to save the Bagges. When Courage wins, Randy releases them and returns to his planet, where he is accepted for his carving skills.

The Evil Eggplants
The Evil Eggplants are a group of talking eggplants that live under the Bagges' farm and are led by a large, deep purple eggplant and his dumb sidekick. They spy on the farm through a periscope placed in an eggplant Muriel grows. They decide to attack the farm because they are not getting enough water and because Muriel harvests the eggplant with the periscope, angering them because they believe it is unjust to eat an eggplant. The eggplants take Muriel captive for her treatment of the eggplant, but Courage eventually saves her and floods the chasing army of eggplants, causing them to take root and leave the farm alone. This episode is the only time the eggplants make an appearance.

Eliza and Elisa Stitch
 Voiced by Fran BrillEliza and Elisa Stitch are a pair of conjoined twin sisters who attempt to be immortal by sewing other women's souls into a quilt. They did this by making them put a symbol on a piece of fabric, turning the person into quilt material, then they say a chant "Be believe belong be believe belong leave the circle never weave this quilt forever." This almost happened to Muriel until Courage stopped them and got trapped in a quilt themself that Eustace sneezed on.

Mona Lisa
Mona Lisa is a woman painted by Leonardo da Vinci and is a work of art long adored by Muriel. After the Bagges are inadvertently locked inside the Louvre, an eerie alignment of the planets occurs and the exhibits come to life including Mona Lisa and The Thinker. Mona Lisa attempts to get the Thinker to kiss her, but he only thinks about it, true to his title. She ends up with another male statue after Courage hits him with Cupid's arrow and holds up her picture. She willingly went back to her painting with the male statue and let Muriel go. She only appears in the episode "So in Louvre Are We Two".

The Thinker
The Thinker is the masterpiece of Auguste Rodin who goes on a date with Mona Lisa during the episode. He is constantly saying, "Let me think." every time Mona Lisa suggests something that they should do. His thinking got in the way though, and he ended up alone in a painting after the planets were no longer aligned. He also only appears in the episode "So in Louvre Are We Two".

Conway the Contaminationist
Conway the Contaminationist is an elderly man claiming to be 193 years old, and who also claims that a filthy environment is "better" and "healthier" than a clean one ("Out with the good air, in with the bad"). He only appears in the episode of the same name, in which he pollutes the Bagge farm and convinces Muriel and Eustace to be filthy as well. Eventually, Courage has to literally clean up Conway's act and sends him away in a large balloon full of the filth that was brought into the house.

Chief Wicky Wicky
Chief Wicky Wicky is the leader of an island tribe looking for someone to sacrifice to their volcano god. Eventually he sees there is no volcano god, and becomes quite friendly.

The Space Whale
The Space Whale is a giant whale from space who is capable of devouring planets, asteroids, ships, and comets. After it attempts to eat a pair of Star-Makers, the male squid sacrifices himself to save the female by exploding into stars that destroys them both. Like the Star-Makers, the Space Whale is the last of its kind.

FishionaryVoiced by Susan SarandonThe Fishionary is a purple female fish who serves as a missionary for the Fish Judges and their octopus coworker. She comes to the farm and takes the Bagges and Courage to the Judges' domain in a bus and falsely accuses them of pulling crimes against seas creatures and the Judges had them sentenced to a giant fishbowl while wearing gills that allow them to breathe water until they become fish. After Courage escapes back to the farm with the Bagges using the Fishionary's bus (with the Judges in pursuit), he and the Judges discover her living in the Bagges house, revealing that she lied to them all just so she can take over the Bagges home and life. Outraged by the Fishionary's betrayal, the Judges had the Bagges released from the bowl and the Fishionary took their place to be recivilized as punishment for her deception.

Minor characters

The General and The Lieutenant
The General: Voiced by Ron McLarty (series) and Jeff Bennett (SON: SDmCtCD movie)The Lieutenant: Voiced by Chuck MontgomeryThe General and The Lieutenant (the former of which is a major general) are two American military officers in Nowhere, who deal with various (paranormal) problems, usually involved in cover-ups of those issues. They take pleasure in fighting each other (i.e. by firing artillery or dropping sixteen-ton weights), and are usually doing so while trying to solve an important problem.

The Three Government Ninjas
The Three Government Ninjas are three ninjas that work for the US government who wear the numbers 1, 2, and 3 respectively on their shirts. They are seen in a few episodes such as "Invisible Muriel" and "The Last of the Starmakers", assisting the general and the lieutenant in cover-ups of paranormal affairs. In "Invisible Muriel", they are shown to be quite stupid; they mistook Courage for Muriel's son, didn't notice they were walking past the invisibility diamond during a chase with Courage, and let Muriel go (with Courage hiding under her apron) since she was made visible again.

Charlie the MouseVoiced by Tom McKeon and John R. Dilworth (Episode: The Mask)Charlie is a delivery mouse and a personal friend of Courage's. He usually helps Courage out which would usually lead to the dialogue between one another. He is usually referred to as Mr. Mouse, but his first name is revealed as Charlie in the episode "The Mask". His interaction with Courage often end with Courage exclaiming "Thanks, Mr. Mouse!", to which he replies "No prob."

Space Dino
Space Dino is a dinosaur-like alien that stands on an asteroid outside Earth's atmosphere, and is always seen with a tennis racket, which he uses to hit celestial objects. In the episode "1,000 Years of Courage", the Space Dino hits a meteor, which strikes Earth and causes time to progress 1,000 years into the future (taking Courage, Eustace, and Muriel into a new civilization of talking bananas), and later causes another meteor to strike the Earth (sending Courage and his owners back to the past).

Courage's Parents
Courage's Parents whose appearances resemble Courage's, except his father had a moustache and his mother wore a hat with a flower on top and holding a blue purse. Not much is known about his parents or even their names, although Courage's father was called Henry during one of the flashbacks, as they were seen only in "Remembrance of Courage Past" centering on flashbacks to his parents in the veterinarian's office, where Courage last saw his parents. They were launched into space by the Cruel Veterinarian, and Courage avoided a similar fate by escaping through a garbage chute, where he was found by Muriel. The Cruel Veterinarian was trapped (by Courage, during the vet's failed attempts to send him, Muriel and Eustace into space) in the rocket, and was launched in space, crash-landing on the planet where Courage's parents and other dogs resided.

Kitty and BunnyVoiced by Barbara McCulloh & Lori Ann MahlKitty and Bunny are a female cat and a rabbit who are best friends. They appeared in the episode "The Mask" where Bunny is held captive by her abusive boyfriend Mad Dog and Kitty tries to save her unintentionally getting help from Courage even though he's kept in the dark about the situation and is terrified of Kitty. Courage later rescued Bunny and defeated Mad Dog and his gang. Bunny gives Courage a kiss on the cheek and Kitty awaited Bunny at the Amtrak passenger train's rear, where they both reunited. Bunny told Kitty that Courage saved her life. Kitty then admitted that she had been wrong about dogs and helped Bunny onto a train she was on. The two thanked Courage and rode off together. Kitty's mask was later used by Eustace to protect his face from explosions while he fixed the boiler.

Icket Bagge
Icket Bagge is Eustace's and Horst's deceased father, Ma Bagge's husband and Muriel's father-in-law. He is mentioned in the episodes "The Sandwhale Strikes" and "Mother's Day". His appearance is very close to Eustace's, except he has a beard. He apparently was very brave and big; as Ma quotes, "You [Eustace] couldn't fill his shoes!". This is no exaggeration, as his shoes were rather huge compared to his son. It is unknown how his relationship with Eustace was, whether he treated Eustace poorly like Horst and Ma or he treated Eustace with respect.

The Duck BrothersVoiced by Will RyanThe Duck Brothers are three space ducks who are brothers. Their names are Donnie, Clyde, and Payne. One of them is always laying eggs even though he is male. They appear in two episodes, the first in which two of them abduct Muriel and place a mind-control device on her for their own purposes. Courage tries to rescue Muriel, only to find that the duck brothers were planning a rescue mission of their own (to save the other duck brother, who has been captured by the United States Government and is about to be made into dinner.) Courage volunteers to be mind-controlled instead, and they save the third brother. The three duck brothers reunite and leave. Two of the brothers make a cameo appearance in "Ball of Revenge", where they play guitars and perform as the half-time show.

The Hunchback of NowhereVoiced by Allen SwiftThe Hunchback of Nowhere is a strange and enigmatic character who has made only one appearance in the first season, in an episode of the same name. In appearance he is a short, facially-deformed little man who is hunchbacked, carrying with him a series of bells. Traveling across Nowhere in the middle of a rainy season, the Hunchback tried to find sanctuary among the locals only to be turned away by them based on his disfigured appearance. However, he is friendly and makes friends with Courage in the barn, where the Hunchback goes after being turned away by Eustace. He finally teaches Eustace that it is what is on the inside that counts.

The Sandman
Sandman is the king of sleep who resides in a tall castle that is apparently made of sand in the middle of a forest, counting sheep indefinitely in a futile attempt to go to sleep.

Professor FrithVoiced by Simon PrebbleProfessor Frith is a man with a thick moustache and thick eyebrows who appears in several roles throughout the series. He first appears as a police officer in "Dr. Le Quack, Amnesia Specialist", a role which he reprises in several episodes. He also appears as Professor Frith, an archeologist and historian in the episode "King Ramses' Curse".

The Star-Maker
The Star-Maker is a squid from space who landed on Earth with her unhatched offspring. She and her mate are the last of their kind. After her mate died saving them from a space whale, she escapes to Earth to hatch the eggs. Eustace called the US government, who contained the squid in a mobile laboratory, but Courage manages to hatch her offspring, who flew up into space to make new stars. Afterwards, she died peacefully and her body became a garden of large flowers and bushes.

The Magic TreeVoiced by Peter FernandezThe Magic Tree is a magical tree that Courage grows, capable of making ideas and dreams come true. It can also talk. It grants wishes, whether they are good or bad, and it ends up granting a wish for Eustace which causes Muriel's head to swell up. Eustace then considers it a threat and decides to chop the tree down and Courage has to defend it for three days in order to cure Muriel. Although Eustace had a bit of sympathy, he chose to cut it down anyway despite its warnings of what will happen if he does. After the tree has been cut down and before it dies, it tells Courage how to cure Muriel. The tree had the last laugh against Eustace as the episode ended with Eustace's head swollen up just like Muriel's had been in retaliation for cutting it down.

Carmen the Serpent
Carmen the Serpent is a monstrous, one-eyed sea serpent who lives in the Evil River, who is "evil" according to a sea-captain. The sea-captain fools the Bagges under the false promise of a luxury cruise, only to reveal that he actually shanghaied them to sail through the Evil River to find and hunt down Carmen. The sea-serpent kidnaps Muriel and takes her to her cave and starts singing opera to her. Courage comes to Muriel's rescue, only to realize that Carmen was not trying to harm Muriel. Courage helps Carmen to dodge and defeat the evil captain.

Twin Raccoons
Twin Raccoons are two raccoon brothers who are revealed as bandits. They attack Courage and kidnap Muriel because they wanted her as a parent. Muriel feels pity on them and accepts them like her own adopted children. At the end of the episode, Muriel's place has been taken over by Eustace as a new parent.

They reappear in "Farmer Hunter, Farmer Hunted" as audience members in the Hunt for Knowledge game show, however their names are "Hugo & Herman".

Horst BaggeVoiced by Peter FernandezHorst Bagge is Eustace's deceased older brother and Muriel's brother-in-law, who was a hunter. The cause of his death is unknown. He was the former owner of the farmhouse as seen in a flashback in the episode "Farmer Hunter, Farmer Hunted". Eustace is now the current owner.  He often belittled Eustace for the latter's low masculinity.

Nowhere NewsmanVoiced by Paul SchoefflerNowhere Newsman is a local TV news reporter. The Nowhere Newsman introduces every episode stating, "We interrupt this program to bring you the Courage the Cowardly Dog show." He is also seen in some episodes when the television is on, conveying news about the antagonist.

Duncan
Duncan is the storm-goddess's pet dog who looks similar to Courage who gets lost. The storm-goddess mistakes Courage for Duncan and tries to take him, but Muriel argues with her (as such, the storm-goddess angrily destroys the farmhouse with a storm). Mr. (Charlie) Rat tells Courage where Duncan is. Courage looks for Duncan and finally finds him in a sewer licking the God-Bone, a bone that no dog can ever stop licking once licked.

The Librarian
The Librarian appears only in the episode "Wrath of the Librarian". She never speaks, she just says "Shhh" while the lion statues in front of the library speak on her behalf.

Clyde the Fog SpiritVoiced by John R. Dilworth''

Clyde the Fog Spirit appears in the computer animated special "The Fog of Courage" who comes to the farm to get the amulet that apparently belongs to the Fog Ghost's long lost love.

Bigfoot
Bigfoot appears only in the episode "Courage Meets Bigfoot".

Velma Dinkley's Tablet
A hi-tech tablet that belongs to Velma Dinkley, which Scooby and Courage connect to Courage's computer to help it provide them with the information they need to rescue their friends. She and the computer both become smitten with each other during their interfacing. Her voice sounds identical to Velma.

Mystery Incorporated 

 Scooby-Doo: This happy-go-lucky hound avoids scary situations at all costs, but he'll do anything for a Scooby Snack!
 Shaggy Rogers: This laid-back dude would rather look for grub than search for clues, but he usually finds both!
 Fred Jones, Jr.: The leader and oldest member of the gang. He's a good sport - and good at them, too!
 Daphne Blake: As a sixteen-year-old fashion queen, Daphne solves her mysteries in style.
 Velma Dinkley: Although she's the youngest member of Mystery Inc., Velma's an old pro at catching crooks.

References

Lists of characters in American television animation
Cartoon Network Studios characters
Characters
Television characters introduced in 1996
Animated characters introduced in 1996
Television characters introduced in 1999
Animated characters introduced in 1999